John Benda (born July 9, 1947) is an American professional golfer playing on the European Seniors Tour.

Benda was born in Sheridan, Wyoming and currently resides in Phoenix, Arizona.  His wife, Veronica, is a native of Chile, and they have no children.

Benda turned professional in 1971. He played extensively overseas on the Asian circuit and Australian Tour. One of his best finishes was a runner-up finish at the 1977 Colgate Champion of Champions in Melbourne, Australia. He finished one behind Bob Shearer and tied, among others, Curtis Strange for second place. He twice qualified for The Open Championship (1979 and 1980) with his best finish being two strokes behind the third round cut in 1980 at Muirfield, Scotland. After his regular playing days were over he went on to become an administrator on the Asian and South American Tours.

After he turned 50, Benda decided to play the senior tours. In 2007 he enjoyed his best year competing on the European Seniors Tour. He was runner-up at the Sharp Italian Seniors Open in May, helped by his lowest ever senior round, a nine-under-par 63 in the second round, besting the course record set by Arnold Palmer, to collect his biggest prize: €15,000. A tied 13th finish at the Bad Ragaz PGA Seniors Open gave him his next best result of the campaign. He finished in 59th place on the Order of Merit in 2006 and just like in 2005. He returned to the Qualifying School to secure a conditional card.

In 2019, Benda was elected to the Iowa Golf Hall of Fame.

Professional wins 
this list may be incomplete
1973 Iowa Open
1985 Waterloo Open Golf Classic

Playoff record
European Senior Tour playoff record (0–1)

References

External links

American male golfers
European Senior Tour golfers
Golfers from Wyoming
Golfers from Phoenix, Arizona
People from Sheridan, Wyoming
1947 births
Living people